The Flying Instructors School or FIS is a training institution of the Indian Air Force. The FIS trains operational pilots of the Indian Armed Forces and friendly foreign countries to be flying instructors. Pilots of the Indian Air Force, the Indian Army, the Indian Navy, Indian Coast Guard and friendly foreign countries join and graduate from the School as Qualified Flying Instructor. It is based at Air Force Station Tambaram, in the suburb of Chennai.

The FIS conducts Qualified Flying Instructors Course and imparts Air and Ground training instructions to trainee pilots. The graduates of FIS are called as Qualified Flying Instructor.

History
The FIS was established on 1 April 1948 at Ambala Air Force Station. Flight Lieutenant L R D Blunt, VrC took over as the first Commanding Officer. The School moved from Ambala to Air Force Station Tambaram in 1954.

Motto

The school's motto is VIDYA DANEN VARDHATE, a line from the Chanakya's ancient treatise Arthashastra. It means Knowledge when imparted multiplies.

See also 
 Basic Flying Training School (India)
 Directorate of Air Staff Inspection
 Air Force Administrative College
 Paratrooper Training School
 Mehar Singh

References 

Indian Air Force
Military education and training in India
1948 establishments in India
Educational institutions established in 1948